Sletta may refer to:

Places
Sletta, Norway, a village in Østre Toten municipality, Innlandet county, Norway
Sletta, Troms, a village in Balsfjord municipality, Troms og Finnmark county, Norway
Sletta, Vestland, a village in Alver municipality, Vestland county, Norway
Sletta Church (Frøya), a church in Frøya municipality, Trøndelag county, Norway
Emigrant Church, Sletta, a church in Alver municipality, Vestland county, Norway

See also
Sletten